Bosljiva Loka is a small settlement on the left bank of the Kolpa River in the Municipality of Osilnica in southern Slovenia. The area is part of the traditional region of Lower Carniola and is now included in the Southeast Slovenia Statistical Region.

Name
Bosljiva Loka was attested in written sources as Wosseyl in 1498.

Church
The local church is dedicated to Saint Vitus and belongs to the Parish of Osilnica. It dates to the late 16th or early 17th century and has a rectangular nave and a three-sided sanctuary with a small belfry above its entrance. Some fragments of wall paintings survive on the interior and exterior walls. Its main altar dates to the late 18th century.

References

External links
Bosljiva Loka on Geopedia

Populated places in the Municipality of Osilnica